Marcelle Ranson-Hervé (10 October 1929 – 3 April 2020) was a French actress.

Biography
Ranson-Hervé was born in Marseille. Her father, Louis Rançon, was an orchestra conductor, who conducted musicians such as Annie Cordy, Bourvil, and Georges Guétary. Her grandfather, Anthonin Rançon, ran a movie theater in Auriol, which hosted Fernandel.

Ranson-Hervé entered the Conservatoire de Paris in 1949, and was in a graduating class alongside Jean Rochefort and Jean-Paul Belmondo. She had a long career as an actress, and gave music lessons at the Conservatoire de Rosny-sous-Bois.

Marcelle Ranson-Hervé died on 3 April 2020 in Marseille at the age of 90 due to COVID-19.

Filmography

Cinema
Une gueule comme la mienne (1960)
Croesus (1960)
Les Mauvais Coups (1960)
Les Arnaud (1967)
Mourir d'aimer (1970)
Now Where Did the 7th Company Get to? (1973)
Robert et Robert (1978)
La Gueule de l'autre (1979)

Television
Les Cing Dernières Minutes (1958)
Macbeth (1959)
Belphegor, or Phantom of the Louvre (1965)
L'Homme qui rit (1972)
Au théâtre ce soir (1972–1981)
Joseph Balsamo (1973)
Les Folies Offenbach 3 (1977)

References

1929 births
2020 deaths
French film actresses
French television actresses
Deaths from the COVID-19 pandemic in France
Actresses from Marseille